Waveney may refer to:
 River Waveney, a river that forms the boundary between Suffolk and Norfolk, England
 Waveney District, a local government district in Suffolk, England
 Waveney (UK Parliament constituency)
 Waveney class lifeboat, a class of lifeboat operated by the Royal National Lifeboat Institution between 1964 and 1999
 HMS Waveney (1903), a River-class destroyer
 Waveney Valley Line, a branch line running from Tivetshall in Norfolk to Beccles in Suffolk
 Robert Adair, 1st Baron Waveney 1811–1886 British Liberal Party politician

People with the given name
 Waveney Bicker Caarten (1902-1990), an English playwright

See also
 HMS Waveney, a list of ships of the Royal Navy
 Empire Waveney, an Empire ship built 1929